Maireana erioclada, commonly known as the rosy bluebush, is a common shrub endemic to Australia, belonging to the genus Maireana.

Description 
Flowers are bisexual, solitary and grow in the angles between the stem and the leaves. It fruits between August to November, producing bright pink or red fruiting bodies that mature to a dull brown.

Taxonomy 
Until 1840, species within the Maireana genus were classified with the genus Kochia. This included M. erioclada which was first formally recorded by English Botanist George Bentham in 1870 as Kochia triptera var. erioclada. This was based on two collections: one from Western Australia (which was chosen by Erwin Gauba in 1948 as the lectotype) and one in cited by Bentham as ‘Murray desert, Herb. F. Mueller’. Following a taxonomic revision of the genus Maireana in 1975 botanist Peter G. Wilson re-classified the species to Marieana ercioclada (Benth.) P.G. Wilson, comb. nov.

Wilson suggested that M. pentatropis has been confused with M. erioclada; however, he has highlighted variations in their features that would allow the two species to be distinguished from each other. For example, the upper fruiting body of M. erioclada is slightly convex and only sparsely ciliate. Wilson also suggests possibly hybridisation between the two.

Distribution 
Maireana erioclada is native to Western Australia, South Australia, New South Wales and Victoria, in the semi-arid interior of Australia. The grows in red-brown soils and on sandy loams on flat ground or in subsaline depressions. In Victoria, the species can be found in the far north-west of the state in mallee communities and extends to the edges of salt pans. The species is noted to invade disturbed areas along roadsides and is salt tolerant, like other saltbush species.

Ecology 
The genus Maireana are collectively known as bluebushes and form an important part many native plant communities in mainland Australia. Many bluebush species grow concurrently together as part of larger communities primarily in the drier, arid climates of Australia, including very low woodlands, open shrublands and open mallee/low woodland. M. erioclada has also been observed  to grow among sand dune units, sandy flats in dune swales and along the edges of saltpans.

Uses 
Despite being well-distributed throughout the semi-arid environment, including in pastoral properties, little is known of the uses of M. erioclada. There are no known records of traditional uses of the species by Aboriginal people, and it is not known if the species if grazed by stock. Research suggests that, given more investigation, there may be potential for Maireana species to be used for fodder in salt-affected areas in southern and eastern Australia

Gallery

References 

Flora of New South Wales
Flora of the Northern Territory
Flora of South Australia
Flora of Victoria (Australia)
erioclada
Caryophyllales of Australia